Nadzeya Drozd (born 8 March 1983) is a Belarusian basketball player for Olimpia Grodno and the Belarusian national team, where she participated at the 2014 FIBA World Championship.

References

1983 births
Living people
Belarusian women's basketball players
Point guards
People from Babruysk
Shooting guards
Sportspeople from Mogilev Region